Carlos Alberto Souza dos Santos, best known as Santos (born December 9, 1960 in Vianópolis, Goiás) is a retired Brazilian football retired player and manager.

Carlos Alberto Santos made nearly 200 Campeonato Brasileiro appearances for Goiás and Botafogo.

Club statistics

Honors
 J.League Best Eleven - 1993
 J. League Cup MVP - 1996
 J. League Meritoriousness Player Award - 2002

References

External links

1960 births
Living people
Association football midfielders
Brazilian footballers
Brazilian football managers
Brazilian expatriate footballers
Expatriate footballers in Japan
Campeonato Brasileiro Série A players
Botafogo de Futebol e Regatas players
Grêmio Esportivo Novorizontino players
Goiás Esporte Clube players
J1 League players
Kashima Antlers players
Shimizu S-Pulse players
Vissel Kobe players
Thespakusatsu Gunma players
Sportspeople from Goiás